L'Isle-Jourdain may refer to:

Lordship of L'Isle-Jourdain, centred on L'Isle-Jourdain, Gers
communes in France:
 L'Isle-Jourdain, Gers, in the Gers department
 L'Isle-Jourdain, Vienne in the Vienne department